Frida Clara (6 January 1909 – 18 January 1986) was an Italian alpine skier. She competed in the women's combined event at the 1936 Winter Olympics.

References

External links
 

1909 births
1986 deaths
Italian female alpine skiers
Olympic alpine skiers of Italy
Alpine skiers at the 1936 Winter Olympics
Place of birth missing